Bosisio Parini is a comune (municipality) in the Province of Lecco in the Italian region Lombardy, located about  north of Milan and about  southwest of Lecco, on the shores of the Lake of Pusiano.

Bosisio Parini borders the following municipalities: Annone di Brianza, Cesana Brianza, Eupilio, Molteno, Rogeno.
The town was the birthplace of the poet Giuseppe Parini, after whom it was later named. The lakefront is titled to the sports journalist Gianni Brera, died in 1992.

People
Giuseppe Parini (1729 – 1799), poet

References

External links
 Official website

Cities and towns in Lombardy